The  Kansas City Brigade season was the opening season for the franchise. After the announcement that the New Orleans VooDoo would suspend operations for the 2006 AFL season due to Hurricane Katrina, the AFL awarded an expansion franchise to Kansas City. Kevin Porter was the team's first head coach. They would be placed in the NC Southern, where they would take New Orleans' spot for the year.

Regular season schedule

Coaching
Kevin Porter was the Brigade's first head coach.

Stats

Offense

Passing

Rushing

Receiving

Touchdowns

Defense

Special teams

Kick return

Kicking

Week 1: at Dallas Desperados

at American Airlines Center, Dallas, Texas
 Game time: January 29, 2006 at 2:00 PM CST
 Game attendance: 11,571
 Officials: Steve Pamon, Wes Fritz, Neil Brunner, R.G. Detillier, Tony Lombardo

Week 2: at Orlando Predators

at TD Waterhouse Centre, Orlando, Florida
 Game time: February 3, 2006 at 7:30 PM EST
 Game attendance: 13,512
 Officials: Riley Johnson, Rick Podraza, Julian Mapp, Paul Engelberts, Bud McCleskey, Buddy Ward

Week 3: vs Austin Wranglers

at Kemper Arena, Kansas City, Missouri
 Game time: February 12, 2006 at 1:00 PM CST
 Game attendance: 16,523
 Officials: David Cutaia, Doug Wilson, Kavin McGrath, Darrel Leftwich, Rich Wilborn, Bob Mantooth
 Offensive Player of the Game: Jerel Myers (KC)
 Defensive Player of the Game: Donvetis Franklin (AUS)
 Ironman of the Game: Kevin Nickerson (AUS)

Week 4: vs Columbus Destroyers

at Kemper Arena, Kansas City, Missouri
 Game time: February 19, 2006 at 1:00 PM CST
 Game attendance: 14,632
 Officials: Tom McCabe, Paul Frerking, Brent Durbin, Bob McElwee, Keith Washington

Week 5: at Georgia Force

at Philips Arena, Atlanta, Georgia
 Game time: February 24, 2006 at 6:30 PM CST
 Game attendance: 11,623
 Officials: Dennie Lipski, Rick Nelson, Kavin McGrath, Darrell Leftwich, Rich Wilbon, Bob Mantooth

Week 6: vs Tampa Bay Storm

at Kemper Arena, Kansas City, Missouri
 Game time: March 5, 2006 at 3:00 PM CST
 Game attendance: 15,227
 Officials: Pat Garvey, Paul King, Mike McCabe, Wayne Mackie, Dino Paganelli

Week 7: vs Philadelphia Soul

at Kemper Arena, Kansas City, Missouri
 Game time: March 13, 2006 at 7:00 PM CST
 Game attendance: 15,379
 Officials: Bill LeMonnier, Mike Delaney, Kelly Saalfeld, Paul Engleberts, Billy Beckett

Week 8: at Austin Wranglers

at Frank Erwin Center, Austin, Texas
 Game time: March 18, 2006 at 7:00 PM CST
 Game attendance: 9,184
 Officials: Steve Pamon, Wes Fritz, Neil Brunner, R.G. Detillier, Tony Lombardo

Week 9: at New York Dragons

at Nassau Veterans Memorial Coliseum, Uniondale, New York
 Game time: March 24, 2006 at 7:30 PM EST
 Game attendance: 10,758
 Officials: Bill Athan, Matt Jordan, Tom Podraza, Tom Symonette, Greg Wilson

Week 10: vs Georgia Force

at Kemper Arena, Kansas City, Missouri
 Game time: April 1, 2006 at 7:00 PM CST
 Game attendance: 16,032
 Officials: Bill McCabe, Jeff Carr, Julian Mapp, Darrell Leftwich, Bud McCleskey

Week 11: vs Los Angeles Avengers

at Kemper Arena, Kansas City, Missouri
 Game time: April 9, 2006 at 12:00 PM CDT
 Game attendance: 15,173
 Officials: David Cutaia, Paul Frerking, Greg Shields, Dave Chesney, James Cole

Week 12: vs Colorado Crush

at Kemper Arena, Kansas City, Missouri
 Game time: April 16, 2006 at 12:00 PM CDT
 Game attendance: 12,814
 Officials: Steve Pamon, Wes Fritz, Neil Brunner, R.G. Detillier, Tony Lombardo

Week 13: at Nashville Kats

at Gaylord Entertainment Center, Nashville, Tennessee
 Game time: April 22, 2006 at 7:00 PM CDT
 Game attendance: 8,214
 Officials: Riley Johnson, Rick Podraza, Allen Baynes, Paul Engelberts, Bud McCleskey

Week 14: at Tampa Bay Storm

at St. Pete Times Forum, Tampa, Florida
 Game time: April 29, 2006 at 7:30 PM EDT
 Game attendance: 17,143
 Officials: Bill Athan, Rick Podraza, Tim Podraza, Tim Symonette, Greg Wilson

Week 15: vs Orlando Predators

at Kemper Arena, Kansas City, Missouri
 Game time: May 6, 2006 at 7:00 PM CDT
 Game attendance: 16,095
 Officials: Dennis Lipski, Rick Nelson, Kavin McGrath, Darrell Leftwich, Rich Wilborn

Week 16: at Utah Blaze

at Delta Center, Salt Lake City, Utah
 Game time: May 12, 2006 at 7:00 PM MDT
 Game attendance: 16,855
 Officials: David Cutaia, Doug Wilson, Greg Shields, Dave Chesney, James Cole

External links

Kansas City Brigade
Kansas City Command seasons